Las Villamizar is a Colombian telenovela created by Juan Carlos Aparicio. It aired on Caracol Televisión from 18 April 2022 to 2 August 2022. Set in the midst of the Spanish Reconquest in 1816, the telenovela follows three high society sisters on a mission to avenge their mother, killed by the Spanish army.

The telenovela stars Shany Nadan, María José Vargas, and Estefanía Piñeres.

Plot 
Carolina, Leonor and Isabela are three sisters from the high society of El Socorro. They join the Liberator Army as spies motivated to pursue those responsible for the death of their mother, Beatriz de Villamizar, at the hands of Captain José María Montenegro. Gerardo Villamizar, using his military past within the Commoners Movement, prepares his three daughters in different disciplines of combat, infiltration and sabotage. The three sisters carry out missions and assignments given to them by the Independence Army, and in return, the army gives them information on the location of the culprits so that they can intercept the murderers and accomplices of Montenegro and thus bring justice.

Cast

Main 
 Shany Nadan as Carolina Mariana de la Trinidad Villamizar Montero
 María José Vargas as Isabela Francisca Dominga Villamizar Montero
 Estefanía Piñeres as Leonor María de la Santa Cruz Villamizar Montero 
 Rodrigo Poisón Barroso as José María Montenegro
 Eloi Costa as Julián Mauricio del Sagrado Corazón de Jesús Montenegro  
 Claudio Cataño as Aurelio Velásquez
 Alexandra Restrepo as Eulalia
 Rafael Zea as Manuel Albarracín 
 Jacques Toukhmanian
 Roberto Cano as Bartolomé 
 Juan Manuel Hernández
 Nidia Paola Valencia
 Brian Moreno as Federico Bravo Cuellar
 Fernando Campo
 Fernando Solórzano as Horacio Cuervo
 Carlos García as Tobón
 Luis Mesa as Gerardo Villamizar

Recurring and guest 
 Juan Andrés Guerrero
 Santiago Soto
 Coraima Torres as Beatriz María de Jesús Montero de Villamizar
 Juan Carlos Ortega
 Sara Pinzón
 Angie Carolina Robles
 Obeida Benavides
 Edwin Hernán García
 Cristal Aparicio
 Carlos Amado Velaides
 Alanna de la Rossa
 Juan José Franco
 Quique Sanmartín
 Lenny Manuel Niño
 Andrés Guede
 Martha Viviana Hernández
 Alejandro Rodríguez

Production 
The telenovela was announced on 29 July 2019. Filming began on 9 February 2021.

Episodes

Reception

Ratings

Awards and nominations

References

External links 
 

2022 telenovelas
2022 Colombian television series debuts
2022 Colombian television series endings
Colombian telenovelas
Caracol Televisión telenovelas
Spanish-language telenovelas